Bhit Shah Museum is a museum in Bhit Shah in the Matiari District of Sindh in southeast Pakistan. It depicts various aspects of Shah Abdul Latif Bhittai's poetry. The museum was set up as a sister organization of the Bhit Shah Cultural Centre. It is frequented by people visiting the shrine nearby.

It was inaugurated on 10 July 1996 by President Farooq Ahmed Leghari at the eve of the 252nd urs of the saint.

References

Museums in Sindh
1996 establishments in Pakistan
Museums established in 1996
Shah Abdul Latif Bhittai